The following elections occurred in the year 1840.

North America

United States
 1840 New York gubernatorial election
 1840 and 1841 United States House of Representatives elections
 1840 United States presidential election
 United States Senate election in New York, 1839/1840
 1840 and 1841 United States Senate elections

See also
 :Category:1840 elections

1840
Elections